The 2021–22 Bangladesh Cricket League One Day, or 2022 Independence Cup, was the inaugural edition of the Bangladesh Cricket League One Day, a List A cricket competition. It was held in Bangladesh, starting on 9 January 2022 and concluding on 15 January 2022. The same teams that competed at 2021–22 Bangladesh Cricket League featured in this tournament.

Central Zone won the tournament, after they beat South Zone by six wickets in the final.

Points table

Fixtures

Round 1

Round 2

Round 3

Final

References

External links
 Series home at ESPN Cricinfo

Bangladesh Cricket League
Domestic cricket competitions in 2021–22
2022 in Bangladeshi cricket
Bangladeshi cricket seasons from 2000–01